The 1956 New Mexico Lobos football team represented the University of New Mexico in the Skyline Conference during the 1956 NCAA University Division football season. In their first season under head coach Dick Clausen, the Lobos compiled a 4–6 record (2–4 against Skyline opponents), finished in a tie for fifth in the conference, and were outscored by opponents by a total of 205 to 167.

On December 29, 1955, the university announced the hiring of Dick Clausen as the new head football coach. Clausen had been the head coach at Coe College in Cedar Rapids, Iowa, from 1948 to 1955.

Schedule

References

New Mexico
New Mexico Lobos football seasons
New Mexico Lobos football